Black Prince Mountain is a  mountain summit located in the Valhalla Ranges of the Selkirk Mountains in southeast British Columbia, Canada. This peak's name refers to the Prince of Darkness and has not been officially adopted. The peak is located in Devils Range, which is a subrange of the Valhallas. The names of the peaks of this small compact range have a devil-related theme: Lucifer Peak, Mount Mephistopheles, Devils Dome, Mount Diablo, Satan Peak, Devils Spire, and Devils Couch.

Based on the Köppen climate classification, Black Prince Mountain has a subarctic climate with cold, snowy winters, and mild summers. The first ascent of the peak was made in 1975 by R. Anderson, S. Baker, V. Joseph, and Peter Wood via the southwest ridge.

See also

Geography of British Columbia

References

External links
 Weather forecast: Lucifer Peak  

Two-thousanders of British Columbia
Selkirk Mountains